Cylindrocarpon is a genus of fungi. Many of the species in this genus are plant pathogens.

Species

Cylindrocarpon abuense
Cylindrocarpon aequatoriale
Cylindrocarpon amamiense
Cylindrocarpon angustum
Cylindrocarpon aquaticum
Cylindrocarpon austrodestructans
Cylindrocarpon bambusicola
Cylindrocarpon bonaerense
Cylindrocarpon bondarzevii
Cylindrocarpon boninense
Cylindrocarpon bulborum
Cylindrocarpon candidum
Cylindrocarpon carneum
Cylindrocarpon castaneae
Cylindrocarpon castaneicola
Cylindrocarpon cedri
Cylindrocarpon chiayiense
Cylindrocarpon chichiense
Cylindrocarpon chlamydospora
Cylindrocarpon cochinchinense
Cylindrocarpon colchicum
Cylindrocarpon congoense
Cylindrocarpon curtum
Cylindrocarpon decumbens
Cylindrocarpon didymum
Cylindrocarpon effusum
Cylindrocarpon eristaviae
Cylindrocarpon faginatum
Cylindrocarpon formicarium
Cylindrocarpon fractum
Cylindrocarpon fraxini
Cylindrocarpon fusiforme
Cylindrocarpon gymnosporangii
Cylindrocarpon hederae
Cylindrocarpon heptaseptatum
Cylindrocarpon hydrophilum
Cylindrocarpon ianthothele
Cylindrocarpon indicum
Cylindrocarpon juglandina
Cylindrocarpon kantschavelii
Cylindrocarpon kaspense
Cylindrocarpon kolesnikowii
Cylindrocarpon lichenicola
Cylindrocarpon liriodendri
Cylindrocarpon luteoviride
Cylindrocarpon macroconidialis
Cylindrocarpon macrodidymum
Cylindrocarpon macrosporum
Cylindrocarpon magnusianum
Cylindrocarpon mangiferarum
Cylindrocarpon mirum
Cylindrocarpon musae
Cylindrocarpon neblinense
Cylindrocarpon obclavatum
Cylindrocarpon obtusisporum
Cylindrocarpon obtusiusculum
Cylindrocarpon orchidearum
Cylindrocarpon orthosporum
Cylindrocarpon ovale
Cylindrocarpon ovatum
Cylindrocarpon panacis
Cylindrocarpon pauciseptatum
Cylindrocarpon peronosporae
Cylindrocarpon pineum
Cylindrocarpon pini
Cylindrocarpon pithyusae
Cylindrocarpon proliferum
Cylindrocarpon rhodospermum
Cylindrocarpon rosae
Cylindrocarpon roseum
Cylindrocarpon rugulosum
Cylindrocarpon sagittariae
Cylindrocarpon schischkinae
Cylindrocarpon sinuatophorum
Cylindrocarpon stilbophilum
Cylindrocarpon suballantoideum
Cylindrocarpon supersimplex
Cylindrocarpon theobromicola
Cylindrocarpon tokyoense
Cylindrocarpon ugandense
Cylindrocarpon ukolayi
Cylindrocarpon uniseptatum
Cylindrocarpon vaginae

Formerly;
Cylindrocarpon destructans = Nectria radicicola

References

External links 
  Cylindrocarpon information

Nectriaceae genera